ONJ may refer to:

 Olivia Newton-John (1948–2022), an English-born Australian singer and actress
 osteonecrosis of the jaw, a severe bone disease that affects the maxilla and the mandible
 Odate-Noshiro Airport (IATA airport code: ONJ), in Akita Prefecture, Japan 
 Onjob language (ISO 639 language code: onj)
 Orchestre National de Jazz, a French jazz ensemble

See also

 
 
 
 OJN
 JNO
 Jon (disambiguation)
 NJO (disambiguation)
 NOJ (disambiguation)